The 2019–20 Czech Cup, known as the MOL Cup for sponsorship reasons, was the 27th season of the annual knockout football tournament of the Czech Republic. It began with the preliminary round on 26 July 2019 and concluded with the final on 1 July 2020. The winner of the cup gained the right to play in the third qualifying round of the 2020–21 UEFA Europa League.

Teams

Preliminary round
108 teams took part in this stage of the competition.

First round

Second round
The second round fixtures were drawn on 19 August 2019 live on ČT Sport.

Third round

Fourth round
The fourth round draw took place on the 4 October 2019.

Quarter-finals

Semi-finals

Final

See also
 2019–20 Czech First League
 2019–20 Czech National Football League

References

External links
Season on soccerway.com

Czech Cup seasons
Cup
Czech